Since Sheffield United F.C.'s formation in 1889, over 80 players have played at senior international level whilst registered with the club.  United's first internationals were defenders Harry Lilley and Michael Whitham who both appeared for England on 5 March 1892 and the most recent player to be capped while with United was another defender, Lecsinel Jean-François who played twice for Haiti in November 2011.

Key
The following lists contain only players who gained international caps whilst a registered player of Sheffield United.  Caps gained prior to joining and subsequent to leaving the club are not included.
Table headings: Apps = Total number of appearances for the national side while a Sheffield United player; Goals = Total number of goals for the national side while a Sheffield United player; Years = Duration of time as a Sheffield United player; Ref = source of information   
Playing positions: GK = Goalkeeper; DF = Defender; MF = Midfielder; FW = Forward
  Players with this colour and symbol in the "Name" column are currently signed to Sheffield United.

Full Internationals

United's first internationals were defenders Harry Lilley and Michael Whitham who both appeared for England on 5 March 1892, although they played against different opposition, as England played two first team games on the same day.  
Peter Ndlovu is the club's top international goalscorer, netting 21 times for Zimbabwe during his tenure with the Blades.

International call-ups during the earliest years of Sheffield United were generally for the home nations (England, Scotland, Wales and Northern Ireland.)  From the 1990s onwards the increasingly multinational nature of the team resulted in call ups for players from across Europe (including Norway, Greece and Estonia) and also from the wider world (including China, Cameroon and Egypt.)

Reserve internationals
"B" teams were devised in the 1940s as reserve squad for or a stepping stone to their relevant full national side.

Junior internationals

Amateur internationals
National sides comprising only amateur players were introduced at the start of the twentieth century, following the rise of professionalism which made it difficult for amateur players to find a place in the main national side.  Despite being a professional club, Sheffield United occasionally contracted players on an amateur basis and those players who represented their country while under such terms are listed below.

Wartime internationals

World War I
With the outbreak of World War I in 1914, organised football continued until the end of the season in 1915.  However, there were growing calls for organised sports to be suspended in favour of the war effort and The Football Association duly halted all competitive fixtures from 1915, a cessation which remained in place until the commencement of the 1919–20 season.  Despite this a number of exhibition games did take place, mainly immediately following the cessation of the conflict.

World War II
With the outbreak of war in 1939 the government immediately imposed a ban on the assembly of crowds and as such, organised football was halted for the duration of the war.  Despite this a series of unofficial exhibition games were organised throughout the wartime period, with the details of Sheffield United's involvement listed below.

The Football League representative teams
Between 1891 and 1976 The Football League arranged representative games against similarly selected teams from the Scottish Football League, the League of Ireland, the Irish League, the Southern League and occasionally against club sides.  26 Sheffield United players made appearances in these fixtures and those are listed below.

FA overseas tours
Between 1899 and 1978 the four football associations of the UK undertook occasional summer tours, playing friendly fixtures against their host nations.  Although the representative sides were often almost a full international team, these games were not considered full internationals.  A number of United players were members of the touring parties on four of those tours between 1910 and 1951, with those players being listed below.

1910 South Africa
Bob Benson
Joe Lievesley
Albert Sturgess

1920 South Africa
Stan Fazackerley
David Mercer

1950 Canada
Jimmy Hagan

1951 Australia
Ted Burgin
Jimmy Hagan
Joe Shaw

Notes

References
General

Specific

Sheffield United F.C.
 
International players
Association football player non-biographical articles
Sheffield U